is a Japanese footballer currently playing as a midfielder for ReinMeer Aomori, on loan from Matsumoto Yamaga.

Career statistics

Club
.

Notes

References

External links

2001 births
Living people
Japanese footballers
Association football midfielders
J2 League players
J3 League players
Matsumoto Yamaga FC players
ReinMeer Aomori players